is a train station located in the city of Yawata, Kyoto Prefecture, Japan.

The name was changed in October 2019 to reflect the station's proximity to the Iwashimizu Hachimangū Shinto shrine.

Lines
 Keihan Electric Railway
 Keihan Main Line
 Iwashimizu-Hachimangū Cable

Layout
Keihan Line
The station on the Keihan Line has an island platform serving 2 north-eastbound tracks and a side platform serving a south-westbound track.

Iwashimizu-Hachimangū Cable (to )
It has 2 dead-end platforms on the sides of a track; one platform is usually used for getting on and off while the other is used for getting off only during crowded seasons.

Adjacent stations

References

Railway stations in Japan opened in 1910
Railway stations in Kyoto Prefecture